Miguel Ángel Botto Salinas (born 14 November 1968) is a Chilean teacher who was elected as a member of the Chilean Constitutional Convention.

References

External links
 
 BCN Profile

Living people
1969 births
21st-century Chilean politicians
Christian Democratic Party (Chile) politicians
Non-Neutral Independents politicians
Democrats (Chile) politicians
Pontifical Catholic University of Valparaíso alumni
Members of the Chilean Constitutional Convention